BoJack Horseman is an American animated sitcom created by Raphael Bob-Waksberg. The series stars Will Arnett as the eponymous character, BoJack Horseman, the washed-up star of the 1990s sitcom Horsin' Around. In the first season, BoJack plans his big return to celebrity relevance with a tell-all autobiography that he dictates to his ghostwriter Diane Nguyen (Alison Brie). BoJack also has to contend with the demands of his agent and on-again-off-again girlfriend, Princess Carolyn (Amy Sedaris); the misguided antics of his freeloading roommate, Todd Chavez (Aaron Paul); and his frenemy, Mr. Peanutbutter (Paul F. Tompkins), who also undergoes a tumultuous long-term relationship with Diane. The series satirizes Hollywood, celebrity culture, and the film industry.

 The sixth and final season is split into two parts, the second part premiered on January 31, 2020.

Series overview

Episodes

Season 1 (2014)

Special (2014)

Season 2 (2015)

Season 3 (2016)

Season 4 (2017)

Season 5 (2018)

Season 6 (2019–20)

References

External links
 
 
 Official website

BoJack Horseman
BoJack Horseman
BoJack Horseman